Lim Hiang Kok (born 9 September 1929) is a Singaporean weightlifter. He competed in the men's light heavyweight event at the 1964 Summer Olympics.

References

1929 births
Living people
Singaporean male weightlifters
Olympic weightlifters of Singapore
Weightlifters at the 1964 Summer Olympics
Place of birth missing (living people)